The 1983–84 international cricket season was from September 1983 to April 1984.

Season overview

September

Pakistan in India

October

West Indies in India

November

Pakistan in Australia

January

1983–84 Benson & Hedges World Series

England in New Zealand

February

Australia in the West Indies

March

England in Pakistan

New Zealand in Sri Lanka

April

1984 Asia Cup

References

International cricket competitions by season
1983 in cricket
1984 in cricket